Uma Riyaz Khan is an Indian actress. She has appeared in Tamil television shows and in supporting roles in a few Tamil films.

Personal life
Uma was the only child of her artist parents. Her father, Kamesh, was a music director and her mother, Kamala Kamesh, was a famous actress who is well respected in the industry. After losing her father at age of nine, she was single-handedly brought up by her mother. She married Malayalam actor Riyaz Khan in 1992. They have two sons, Shariq Hassan and Shamarth Hassan.

Khan went to Fatima Convent School in Kodambakkam. She was a state level athlete in 100 meters, Javelin throw, and a professional dancer. She was a trained classical dancer, and later switched to salsa and other Latin American dance forms.

Career
Uma's first film was the Hindi film Muskurahat (1992) by director Priyadarshan. In the film she played Amrish Puri's daughter. She described her first movie as a 'superb' experience. She calls her work in the film Anbe Sivam (2003) as her magnum opus. For her performance in Mouna Guru (2011), she received a lot of appreciation in the form of awards that year.

She took part in second season of the much talked about show, Jodi Number One, which aired on Vijay TV in 2007. After that she judged a show called Kalakka Povathu Yaaru.  Uma Riyaz Khan acted in the negative role in Chandrakumari serial along with Raadhika Sarathkumar in Sun TV .

Filmography

Films

Television
Serials

Shows

Awards
Vijay Awards
 2011 - Vijay Award for Best Supporting Actress - Mouna Guru

Vikatan Award
2011 - Vikatan Award for Best Supporting Actress - Mouna Guru

References

External links
 

1975 births
Living people
Tamil actresses
Indian film actresses
Actresses from Chennai
Actresses in Tamil cinema
Actresses in Tamil television
Actresses in Hindi cinema
Actresses in Kannada cinema